The 2020–21 season was Rotor Volgograd's first season back in the Russian Premier League, the highest tier of association football in Russia, since 2004. Rotor Volgograd finished the season in 15th position, being relegated back to the Russian Football National League whilst they were also knocked out of the Russian Cup at the Round of 32 stage.

Season events
On 6 August, Nikolay Kuznetsov joined Sokol Saratov on loan for the season, whilst Jano Ananidze joined the club on a one-year contract.

On 10 August, Rotor announced the signing of Armen Manucharyan from Pyunik.

On 13 September, Rotor's home game against Krasnodar was postponed due to 10 cases of COVID-19 within the Rotor squad. On 16 September, Krasnodar were awarded a 3-0 technical victory over Rotor Volgograd.

On 18 September, Rotor's game away to Rostov was postponed due to a COVID-19 outbreak within the Rotor Volgograd squad. On 22 September, Rostov were awarded a 3-0 technical victory over Rotor Volgograd.

On 15 October, Rotor Volgograd signed Andrés Ponce on loan from Akhmat Grozny for the remainder of the season.

On 19 March, Alyaksandr Khatskevich left his role as Head Coach of Rotor. The following day, 20 March, Yuri Baturenko was announced as Rotor's new Head Coach.

On 22 March, Rotor announced that Yury Logvinenko had left the club by mutual consent due to injury.

Squad

Out on loan

Transfers

In

Loans in

Out

Loans out

Released

Friendlies

Competitions

Overview

Premier League

Results summary

Results by round

Results

League table

Russian Cup

Round of 32

Squad statistics

Appearances and goals

|-
|colspan="14"|Players away from the club on loan:

|-
|colspan="14"|Players who appeared for Rotor Volgograd but left during the season:

|}

Goal scorers

Clean sheets

Disciplinary record

References

FC Rotor Volgograd seasons
Rotor Volgograd